The 1999–2000 season was the 77th season in the existence of UD Salamanca and the club's first season back in the second division of Spanish football.

Competitions

Overall record

Segunda División

League table

Results summary

Results by round

Matches

Source:

Copa del Rey

First round

References

UD Salamanca
Salamanca